Lorenzo Bacci (born 14 December 1994) is an Italian sports shooter. He competed in the men's 10 metre air rifle event at the 2020 Summer Olympics.

References

External links
 

1994 births
Living people
Italian male sport shooters
Olympic shooters of Italy
Shooters at the 2020 Summer Olympics
Place of birth missing (living people)
21st-century Italian people